Petrén is a surname. Notable people with the surname include: 

Ann Petrén (born 1954), Swedish actress
Karl Anders Petrén (1868–1927), Swedish physician
Louise Petrén-Overton (1880–1977), Swedish mathematician
Melissa Petrén (born 1995), Swedish handballer 
Simon Petrén (born 1986), Swedish music producer, songwriter, and engineer